Task-invoked pupillary response (also known as the "Task-Evoked pupillary response") is a pupillary response caused by a cognitive load imposed on a human and as a result of the decrease in parasympathetic activity in the peripheral nervous system. It is found to result in a linear increase in pupil dilation as the demand a task places on the working memory increases. Beatty evaluated task-invoked pupillary response in different tasks for short-term memory, language processing, reasoning, perception, sustained attention and selective attention and found that it fulfills Kahneman's three criteria for indicating processing load. That is, it can reflect differences in processing load within a task, between different tasks and between individuals.  It is used as an indicator of cognitive load levels in psychophysiology research.

Early History 
Hundreds of years ago, it was said that merchants could read into their customer's thoughts and intentions by paying attention to changes in the customer's pupil diameter.

Biological background 
Pupil size is controlled by the iris dilator muscle, which dilate the pupil, and the iris sphincter muscle, which contract the pupil. These are affected by the sympathetic and parasympathetic nervous systems respectively.

Older research suggests this pupillary response is most likely a result of the reticular activating system of the brainstem being linked to the cerebral cortex. The regulation of some functions of the eye, including dilation, are directly affected by the reticular system. Parts of this system are linked to higher nervous structures that are directly involved in cognition and task-related activities as well as the activation of the cortex. These nervous structures include the:

 thalamus
 caudate body
 archicortex
 neocortex

As such, cognitive load can have a direct effect on some functions of the reticular system, like the dilation of the eye, and cause task-evoked pupillary response.

More modern work finds that the pupillary response is directly related to the locus-coeruleus norepinephrine (LC-NE) system. The LC-NE system is linked to areas of the brain related to the detection, cognition and attention of task demands. It is also very likely that the reason the LC is linked to pupillary activity is due to the shared interactions with the gigantocellularis nucleus of the ventral medulla.

Experimental findings

Short term memory 
Beatty and Kahneman (1966) asked participants of an experiment to remember a sequence of digits at a rate of one per second. A pause of 2 seconds followed and then the participants were asked to repeat the digits at the same rate. They found pupillary diameter increased with each digit the participants heard and then decreased as they repeated the digits back in order. The maximum size depended on how many digits were to be remembered and repeated. As such, the extent of dilation is directly related to the level of difficulty of the task, thus the amount of cognitive load, or "mental effort"  that was experienced by participants. For this reason, task-evoked pupillary response has potential to be used as a measure of cognitive load.

Diagnosticity 
Task-evoked pupillary response is not diagnostic when the cognitive load is related to task performance. This is because the pupillary response is the same for a large array of activities that require mental effort including perceptual, cognitive and response related tasks. Instead, task-evoked pupillary response can be observed as a measure of cognitive load. However, task-evoked pupillary response appears to be diagnostic when it comes to data-limited processing. For example, if presented with changes to weak auditory stimuli, the pupil will not demonstrate any changes in diameter but will instead be affected by changes to experimental conditions.

Task Performance 
Some studies suggest pupillary dilation due to task-evoked pupillary response is associated with greater task performance. For example, when taking part in an experiment involving the n-back task, a correlation was observed between those with higher dilation, due to pupillary response, and improved performance.

Conversely, other studies show the opposite relationship, where higher pupillary dilation is associated with lower task performance. When presented with a task measuring the Stroop effect, higher pupil dilation positively correlated with the size of the Stroop effect. This is suggested to be because those who are poor at a test regarding incongruencies must put in more mental effort than those more skilled at stopping themselves when faced with incongruency. However, the same correlation could be explained through the potential ease with which information is accessed by those who have good inhibitory control.

Expertise 
Those who are experts in their field experience a lower cognitive load and so a smaller task-evoked pupillary response when compared to novices. This is suggested to be because experts are able to more easily access information.

Intelligence 
A study showed that the pupils of more intelligent individuals show a smaller increase in diameter when compared to less intelligent individuals completing the same arithmetic task. However, tests, targeting fluid intelligence showed that individuals with a higher level of fluid intelligence displayed greater dilation of the pupils than those with lower fluid intelligence.

Negative results 
Wierwille and colleagues found that task-evoked pupillary response provided negative results when pilots were asked to run a flight simulator while solving navigational problems. However, it is argued that during this experiment, the pupil size was recorded 3 seconds after the visual stimulant of the flight simulator display was presented. Due to the fact that the pupillary response is very rapid, it may be the case that the response may have finished by the time the pupil size was measured.

Reliability 
Some external variables such as light and near reflexes may cause variance to the task-evoked pupillary response. It is for this reason, that Kramer argues that the use of this pupillary response as a scientific measure of cognitive load should be kept to the laboratory, and not for use in the field. This is shown further by Hess who found that when participants move their view across a non-uniform field, such as a photograph, the task-evoked pupillary response may be affected.

See also 
 Pupil
 Pupillometry
 Psychophysiology

References 

Eye